The Unknown is the fourteenth book in the Animorphs series, written by K.A. Applegate. It is narrated by Cassie.

Plot summary
Cassie and Rachel drive with the former's father, Walter, to the Dry Lands outside of town. 'Crazy Helen', a client of Walter's, has informed him of a sick horse stumbling about the plains. Helen rants on about Martians while Walter and the girls search for the horse in the dark. Rachel spots it trying to make a call at a pay phone. The horse then tries to escape, but is too weak to walk, and falls over. Cassie and Rachel notice a Yeerk falling out of the dying horse's ear. Cassie, getting a bad feeling, tells Rachel to run. A second later, they're knocked over by an explosion. Cassie wakes up in Crazy Helen's caravan, who insists 'it was the Martians!'. Cassie and Rachel decide she is half right - and assume that the Yeerks were trying to keep them away from the horse.

The other Animorphs are skeptical, though. Rachel and Cassie are frustrated, but Jake allows the group to go back to the site and investigate. Cassie, Rachel, Marco and Tobias travel in bird morph, and land in a rocky outcrop. They're promptly arrested by soldiers, and taken to the Air Force base - Zone Ninety-One. There, they meet Captain Torelli, the chief of base security, who is suspicious of the kid's lack of shoes. Cassie, Rachel and Marco, fearing being grounded, or charged with trespassing, give the captain fake names and phone numbers. The captain leaves, and the kids escape via cockroach morph. They escape outside, but Cassie is nearly crushed by a tank. Tobias picks her up, and airlifts the trio to safety.

Cassie decides on a new plan. They need horse morphs from the racetrack. They're nearly caught by the staff, and Cassie morphs Minneapolis Max - a champion stallion. The animal's jockey assumes Cassie is the real horse, causing Cassie to be caught up in a race, which she wins. The Animorphs are now ready to infiltrate Zone Ninety-One.

Back in the Dry Lands, the teens morph their respective horse morphs. They join the alleged Yeerk herd, and trot directly into the base. They hear the horse-Controllers speak Galard - the interstellar lingua franca. Ax translates for them, telling them that the Yeerks are planning to complete their mission tonight. The Yeerks promptly break into a run, and rush into a hangar. There, the Animorphs see what the government's been hiding. They know it's not human, but they don't know what it is. Neither do the Yeerks. The Yeerks are depressed and afraid, aware of the consequences for failure. They rendezvous with Visser Three, who decapitates the Yeerk 'responsible' for the failure. The Visser then orders his Hork-Bajir to eliminate the suspicious-looking horses standing close by. Cassie knocks over a Hork-Bajir, and the rest make a break for it. It is then that an embarrassed Ax tells them what the humans have been guarding: a disposable waste module from an Andalite Dome ship; an alien toilet. The disgusted Animorphs decide they've been wasting their time, and head home.

At home, Cassie berates herself for wasting her team's time, but then realizes the significance of the Andalite toilet; it's proof that sentient life exists beyond Earth, and that Visser Three needed humanity to know as little as possible in order for the invasion to continue to run smoothly. Cassie then remembers a pin-up board for 'Gondor Industries'; a dummy corporation employee's day out. Cassie takes the Animorphs to The Gardens amusement park. Cassie figures that Visser Three plans to kidnap Captain Torelli and other Air Force staff at Zone Ninety-One. The Animorphs, chased by Captain Torelli, end up in the horror house, where the Hork-Bajir wait. The children morph, and a battle ensues. They wound the Hork-Bajir and rescue the captain from Visser Three. The Yeerks escape in their vessels, in front of totally oblivious humans at a night parade.

Morphs

Animorphs books
1998 science fiction novels
1998 American novels
United States Air Force in fiction